Ariopelta capensis is a species of air-breathing land slug, a terrestrial, pulmonate, gastropod mollusk in the family Oopeltidae.

Ariopelta capensis is the type species of the genus Ariopelta.

Distribution
Distribution of Ariopelta capensis includes South Africa.

Ecology 
Ariopelta capensis serves as the second intermediate host for a parasite, the brachylaimid trematode Renylaima capensis. Unencysted metacercariae, usually brevicaudate, infect the kidney of Ariopelta capensis and differ from mature cercariae by only a slightly greater size.

References
This article incorporates CC-BY-2.0 text from the reference

Endemic fauna of South Africa
Oopeltidae
Gastropods described in 1848